The 2019 Kagame Interclub Cup was the 42nd edition of the Kagame Interclub Cup, a football competition for clubs in East and Central Africa, which is organised by CECAFA. It took place in Rwanda from 7 July to 21 July 2019.

All times shown are in East Africa Time (UTC+3).

Participants
The following 16 clubs took part in the competition:

Group A
 TP Mazembe
 Rayon Sports
 Atlabara
 Kinondoni MC

Group B
 KCCA
 Mukura Victory Sports
 Azam
 Bandari

Group C
 A.P.R.
 Proline
 Heegan
 Green Eagles

Group D
 Gor Mahia
 KMKM
 AS Maniema Union
 Motema Pembe (Withdrew from the tournament)
 AS Port

Officials

Referees
 Hassan Eĺ Hagi (Somalia)
 Jean Claude Ishimwe (Rwanda)
 Nsoro Ruzindana (Rwanda)
 Samwel Uwikunda (Rwanda)
 Israel Mpaima (Kenya)
 Anthony Ogwayo (Kenya)
 William Oloya  (Uganda)
 Ali Sabilla  (Uganda)
 Elly Ally Sasii (Tanzania)
 Ali Mfaume Nassoro (Zanzibar)
 Mohamed Diraneh Guedi (Djibouti)
 Pierre Kibingo (DR Congo)

Assistant Referees

 Bashir Sheikh Suleiman  (Somalia)
 Mohamed Nour Abdi  (Somalia)
 Ambroise Hakizimana (Rwanda)
 Raymond Nonati Bwiliza (Rwanda)
 Oliver Odhiambo (Kenya)
 Tony Kidiya (Kenya)
 Isa Masembe (Uganda)
 Liban Abdirazack Ahmed (Djibouti)
 Romeo Kasengele (Zambia)
 Gasim Madir Dehiya (South Sudan)
 Frank Komba (Tanzania)
 Ferdinand Chacha (Tanzania)

Group stage
 
The group stage featured sixteen teams, with 4 teams in Group A, Group B, Group C, and D. Two teams from Group A and B and Group C and Group D advanced to the knockout stage.

Group A

Group B

Group C

Group D

Quarterfinals

Semifinals

Third place

Final

Top scorers
1 goal
  Jules Ulimwengu
  Hassan Abdallah
  Thierry Manzi
  Ibrahim Juma
  Kennedy Musonda
  Spencer Sautu

References

Kagame Interclub Cup
Kagame Interclub Cup
2019 in Tanzanian sport
International association football competitions hosted by Tanzania